The Delhi Public School Society in Delhi, consists of numerous Society schools. The number of schools has been consistently increasing over six decades. As of April 2022, there are 13 core schools and around 206 franchise schools in the DPS Society.

The official website of DPS Society provides the list of 206 Franchise DPS Schools in India and 8 DPS Schools in abroad (as of April 2022).

Core Schools in India

As of April 2022, there are 13 original or core branches of Delhi Public School (DPS). The list of core schools is as follows:

 Delhi Public School, Mathura Road (Delhi)
 Delhi Public School, R. K. Puram (Delhi)
 Delhi Public School, Sector-30, Noida (UP)
 Delhi Public School, Vasant Kunj (Delhi)
 Delhi Public School, Faridabad (Haryana) 
 Delhi Public School, Greater Noida (UP)
 Delhi Public School, Bulandshahr (UP)
 Delhi Public School, Rohini (Delhi)
 Delhi Public School, Dwarka (Delhi)
 Delhi Public School, Navi Mumbai 
 Delhi Public School International, Saket 
 Delhi Public School, Knowledge Park-5
 Delhi Public School, Sector-122, Noida

DPS Noida
Delhi Public School, Noida, was set up in 1982 by the DPS Society. It is one of the 13 "Core Schools" under the direct management of the DPS Society.  It is located in Sector 30, Noida. It is affiliated to the Central Board of Secondary Education and has Science, Commerce and Humanities streams. Within the streams, subjects ranging from Biotechnology to Entrepreneurship are offered. The school occupies 15 acres and the Gandhi park is located in its campus. The DPS Noida hostel, opened in 1995, provides boarding facilities for boys and girls. It has a mess, a common/TV room and gym facilities. It also has various new buildings for the new classes. The current principal of the school has also been accused of murdering a member of contractual staff, following an alleged coverup of molestation.

DPS Faridabad
A school located in Faridabad a satellite town of Delhi. It was founded on 10 July 1995. It is one of the 13 "Core Schools" under the direct management of the DPS Society. Today the school enrolls over 10,000 students as day pupils and hostelers, and conducts classes for preschoolers to senior secondary. It also conducts a social responsibility programme called DPS Shiksha Kendra for underprivileged children, who are provided with books, stationary, and uniforms.

DPS Greater Noida
Delhi Public School, Greater Noida is located in the Gautam Buddha Nagar district, in Sector - Gamma II, Greater Noida city. The school is affiliated to the Central Board of Secondary Education, New Delhi from class Nursery to XII and is one of the core schools of the Delhi Public School Society. The current principal is Ms.Sandhya Awasthi.

The school was established in 1998 and Ranjeev Taneja was the founder principal. He is presently the secretary of DPS Society. DPS Greater Noida is divided into three wings: junior, middle and senior school. It has 4900 students (approx.) and 400 faculty members.. DPS Greater Noida is divided into three wings: junior, middle and senior school.

DPS Bulandshahr
Delhi Public school, Bulandshahr was inaugurated in the year 1997.  It is one of the 13 "Core Schools" under the direct management of the DPS Society. Affiliated with the Central Board of Secondary Education, School offers classes from Nursery to class XII. The school aims for excellence, by providing better educational facilities to the residents of Bulandshahr and its adjoining areas.

DPS Rohini
Delhi Public School, Rohini or
DPS Rohini was established on 3 July 1995. It is one of the 13 "Core Schools" under the direct management of the DPS Society.

DPS Dwarka
The school is affiliated to the Central Board of Secondary Education for classes from Nursery to XII. It is one of the 13 "Core Schools" under the direct management of the DPS Society.
The school has facilities for cricket, football, basketball, tennis, badminton, swimming, volleyball, table tennis, gym etc. It also has a hostel for the students (boys) belonging to other states. The school has four houses namely Chenab, Ganges, Jhelum  and Ravi. The school has over 2,200 students with a staff of 250 teachers.

DPS Navi Mumbai
It is one of the 13 "Core Schools" under the direct management of the DPS Society. The school houses more than 3,000 pupils from pre-nursery to XII in its 7.25 acre campus. Some of the pupils have taken part in the Model United Nations circuit, music, dance and other co curricular activities at regional and national levels. In November 2019, pupils from class 9 were selected for an international music competition and visited Germany. It is located next to a holding pond called the ‘DPS Lake’ which is a hub of migratory birds. The first principal at DPS Nerul was PC Chabhra who retired in 2013. It is one of the best schools in India with an average of 89% in Class 10 CBSE Board Exams with all students in the first division.

Franchise schools in India

As of April 2022, there are around 206 schools running under the DPS Society as a Franchise. This means these schools are not the core schools and are not managed directly by the DPS Society.

List of Franchise schools
The following schools are part of the Delhi Public School Society in India. These are not the Core schools, they function as a franchise under the brand name of DPS Society.

 Delhi Public School, Karnal, Haryana  
 Delhi Public School, Khurai, Madhya Pradesh
 Delhi Public School, Agra 
 Delhi Public School, Budgam, J&K

 Delhi Public School, Indirapuram, Ghaziabad
 Delhi Public School, Aligarh 
 Delhi Public School, Civil Lines, Aligarh 
 Delhi Public School, Hathras 
 Delhi Public School, Jhansi 
 Delhi Public School, Abohar (Punjab)
 Delhi Public School, Mahendragarh, Haryana
 Delhi Public School, Lucknow, Indira Nagar
 Delhi Public School, Shaheed Path, Lucknow
 Delhi Public School, Khajaguda, Hyderabad, Telangana 
 Delhi Public School, Nacharam, Uppal, Hyderabad, Telangana
 DPS Ahmedabad
 Delhi Public School, East - Ahmedabad (Hirapur).
 Delhi Public School, Azaad Nagar, Kanpur

 Delhi Public School, Tapi, Surat, Gujarat
 Delhi Public School, Asansol, West Bengal
 Delhi Public School, Bareilly (UP)
 DPS Barra, Kanpur

 Delhi Public School, Bahadurgarh, Jhajjar, Haryana 
 DPS South Bangalore at Kanakapura. Delhi Public School Bangalore South was the first DPS to be established at Bangalore, in 2001.
 DPS Bangalore North at Yelahanka
 DPS Bangalore East at Sulikunte
 DPS Bangalore West at Yeswanthpur
 DPS Bangalore E-CITY at Electronic City
 Delhi Public School, Bathinda, Punjab 
 Delhi Public School, BALCO, Korba (Chhattisgarh)
 DPS Bilaspur in Chhattisgarh  The founding principal was Arun Prakash.
 Delhi Public School, Bhilai, Chhattisgarh
 Delhi Public School, Bokaro, Jharkhand 
 Delhi Public School, Rau (MP)
 Delhi Public School, Chandigarh  
 Delhi Public School, Chennai (Tamil Nadu)
 Delhi Public School, Coimbatore 
 Delhi Public School, Damanjodi (Odisha)

 Delhi Public School, Dhaligaon (Assam)
 Delhi Public School, Meerut

 Delhi Public School, Dehradun 
 Delhi Public School, Dhanbad (Jharkhand)
 Delhi Public School, Nadergul (Telangana Hyderabad)
 Delhi Public School, Panvel (Maharashtra)

DPS Durg
DPS Durg is the largest (in terms of built-up area) Delhi Public School in the state of Chhattisgarh in Durg district. The campus is home to 3,962 students and has 170 teachers. Founded in 2003, the school is located on Junwani Road, Chhattisgarh. The school was founded by industrialist and philanthropist Chaudhary Sri. Mitter Sen Sindhu ( late), who was the founder of Sindhu Education Foundation, Indus Group of Institutions. and Param Mitra Manav Nirman Sansthan.

DPS NTPC Korba
DPS NTPC Korba is one of the satellite schools in the chain of schools run by DPS.  This is the  First DPS School Of The Region. This co-educational school was established on, 3 July 1985, in collaboration with the public sector, NTPC, which provided the land (15 Acres) and assistance in various other matters at its inception. It is one of the two DPS in Korba District, Chhattisgarh. With 204 students on roll in classes VI-IX at the outset, the school has come a long way with a present strength of 2000 from classes Nursery to XII. It has four houses namely- Ganga, Jhelum, Chenab, and Yamuna.

DPS Durgapur
Delhi Public School Durgapur is situated in Bidhan Nagar, Durgapur, West Bengal, and started in 2012. The school is following the CBSE curriculum. It has hostel facilities. It is one of the best schools in Durgapur. It is a sister school of DPS Ruby Park, Kolkata.

DPS Digboi
The school is located at a landscaped area of 19 acres in Digboi, Assam. It was opened in 1996 and is a joint venture between Indian Oil Corp. Ltd and Delhi Public School Society. The school has a separate hostel for both boys and girls. The institution is presently headed by Mr. V.K. Chandel.

DPS Duliajan
DPS Duliajan was set up in 2000. Today, it is a co-educational school. The school is a joint venture between OIL and DPS Society.

DPS Farakka

A private co-educational day school located inside the NTPC TTS Township in Farakka, West Bengal. It is run by the Delhi Public School Society with funding from NTPC, Farakka. It was the first Delhi Public School to be established in West Bengal after being taken over by the DPS society in 1992 from Nabarun Point English Medium School. Mr. Sunil Sinha Roy was the first principal of the school, who along with the General Manager of NTPC, FSTPP Mr. G.S.Sohal laid the foundation for this school. The school is affiliated with the Central Board of Secondary Education (CBSE), New Delhi, and offers courses in commerce and science. It enrolls over 1,500 pupils ranging from Standard I to Standard XII.. The school has a 5-acre campus and is well connected to the nearby townships. The NTPC management provides school buses for all of its employees' children. The Farakka Barrage Project management also provides buses.

The school inherited the Nabarun Point Building in 1992. There is an auditorium. From the end of 2017 a new building is used.

DPS Fulbari,Siliguri

It is affiliated with CBSE. It is located in Phulbari near the Bangladesh Border.

DPS Garhpar
DPS operates on the franchise model. There are three DPS schools in Garhpar - DPS North, DPS South and DPS East. They are owned mostly by the family of its founder, a leading politician. All three branches are built in the rural outskirts. It has won the international school award from the British Education Council and has international exchanges with other schools in Germany etc. A peace connect program has been established with Roots International in Islamabad, Pakistan.

One new DPS school at Whitefield, Garhpar, started in 2011. It is run by a different trust but it belongs to the DPS family in Delhi.

DPS Gurdaspur
It was established in 2011. The school follows a CCE (Continuous and Comprehensive Evaluation) method to evaluate the results. It has archery, badminton, basketball, football, a swimming pool, roller skating, tennis, and table tennis facilities.

Delhi Public School Gurgaon, Sector-45 
It was established in 2002. It is led by respected principal Aditi Misra and is located in Sector 45, Block C, Uday Nagar, Gurgaon. The school is affiliated with the Central Board of Secondary Education (CBSE), New Delhi, and offers courses in Commerce, Science, and Humanities. It has over 5,000 pupils and a dedicated faculty of 500 plus. There are three school buildings spread over the city, Infant Wing (Infant to Nursery grades), Primary Wing (Prep to III grade) and Senior Wing (IV to XII grades).

DPS Gandhidham
Established in 2005–06, Harsh Wal was the founder and principal of DPS Gandhidham.

DPS Guwahati
Started on 21 April 2003, this school had more than 1,200 students on the first day of the opening. Arun Prakash was the founder principal and Anant Barjatiya was the founder PVC under the leadership of DPS Society Chairman Sri Nrendra Kumar. It has an area of 24 acres and is currently the oldest-running school under the aegis of the DPS Society in Guwahati. It is one of the 11 "Core Schools" under the direct management of the DPS Society.

DPS Gwalior, Rairu
Established in July 2006, it consists of three buildings for Juniors, Seniors, and one activity building, one Multipurpose Hall. It is located on the outskirts of the city of Gwalior in Rairu. Sunil Bhalla has been the Principal of the school since its inception. The school has about 1,750 pupils, a staff of 150, and is spread over 12 acres. The school offers streams of science and commerce. The students are divided into four houses: Ganga, Yamuna, Narmada and Kaveri. There are the DPS schools in Gwalior: DPS Rairu, DPS Morar and DPS Malanpur.

DPS Hapur
Established in 2004 at Preet Vihar, Uttar Pradesh, the school has 5,025 pupils. The founder of the school was S.L. Dhawan and is affiliated to CBSE board, Delhi. The school has Junior and Senior wings and an open-air theatre for school functions. The school is situated 3 km away from Hapur.

DPS Haridwar
The school was established in 1977. It was the first ever venture of DPS Society outside Delhi. The school has five wings: the pre-primary wing, the primary wing, the junior wing, middle wing and the senior wing. A notable alumni is actor Shriya Saran and Dr. Kriti Khurana. The school occupies 60 acres in the foothills of the Shivalik Range, with the Ganges flowing in the vicinity. It is a co-educational, English-medium school affiliated to CBSE. There are 3,600 pupils. The school provides education to children from Prep-Jr. to Class XII, offering Science, Commerce and Humanities streams at +2 level. It has extended its building structure and has a national cricket ground.

DPS Harni
It was established in April 2006, in Harni, Vadodara. A. K. Sinha, the former Principal of DPS Vadodara, was instrumental in setting up the school.

DPS Howrah
It is affiliated to CBSE. It is located near Makardaha Station.

DPS Indore
It was established in July 2003. The campus is spread over 21 acres. The school has been crowned as 'Dream School' by the government of Madhya Pradesh.

DPS Jammu
Delhi Public School Jammu in Jammu and Kashmir was established in 1998 by Karan Singh as the first branch of Delhi Public School Society.

DPS Jodhpur
The beginning of Delhi Public School Jodhpur dates back to 1998 when D.R. Mehta, the Chairman of SEBI, encouraged Dinesh Chaman Kothari to open an educational institution for the children of Jodhpur. The DPS Society provided the motivation and guidance to Kothari. DPS Jodhpur is promoted by Shugan Chandra Kothari Trust and managed by Delhi Public School Society, and became functional on 20 April 1998 at Ratanada with 280 children enrolled initially. The institution offered a comprehensive education for the school children and to its own building at Pal in 2001. The school occupies 15 acres and houses more than 5000 pupils.

DPS Jaipur
DPS Jaipur is one of the largest branches of DPS. The Delhi Public School Jaipur has one wing (nursery to 12th) in Bhankrota and a primary wing (nursery to eighth) is located in Vidyadhar Nagar.

DPS Kalyanpur

Delhi Public School Kalyanpur, Kanpur, was established in 2002. At the class XI and XII level, the school offers three streams – Science, Commerce and Humanities. The school has about 8,000 pupils and is the biggest school in Kanpur in area and has won many awards. It facilitates include the study foreign language such as Japanese, French, German and Urdu.

DPS Kalinga
DPS Kalinga is the second DPS in the eastern state of Odisha after DPS Nalconagar, Angul. It was founded in 2003 by Odisha Stevedores Limited Managing Director Mahimananda Mishra. The founding principal was Manisha Mitra. DPS Kalinga has received many accolades including brilliant performances in National and International Olympiads, and best school in the Eastern zone.

DPS Kollam
DPS Kollam, the first DPS in the Indian state of Kerala, was established in 2019 at Meeyannoor near Adichanalloor, 18 km away from Kollam. It is a co-educational, residential-cum-day-boarding school offering a daycare facility.

DPS Kurukshetra
DPS Kurukshetra is the DPS in the Northern Indian state of Haryana.

Delhi Public School Maruti Kunj, Gurgaon

Delhi Maruti Kunj, established in 1995, is a day school offering a campus spread over 13 acres in the Aravali Hills. DPS Maruti Kunj was started when automobile-maker Maruti Udyog Limited joined with the DPS Society to create the school. DPS Maruti Kunj is the oldest DPS in Gurgaon. The school started with Mr. Stalin Malhotra as the principal; it began with 350 pupils and 35 staff members. By 2020, the school had 3,500 pupils, more than 150 teachers and around 50 other staff members. The school is affiliated to the Central Board of Secondary Education (CBSE).

Delhi Public School Megacity, Kolkata
Delhi Public School Megacity was established in 2004, with the first classes starting on April 25, 2004, in Kolkata. It is the only DPS other than Delhi Public School Newtown, Kolkata, to be affiliated to the Council for the Indian School Certificate Educations (CISCE). It is an ISO 9001:2015 and 14001:2015 & British Council International School Award (ISA) Certified School.

Delhi Public School, Nacharam
Established in 1947. Currently has strength of 200 students. It is affiliated to the CBSE and Cambridge International. The school also caters to CBSE-I. The pupils are divided among four houses: Emerald (Green), Ruby (Red), Sapphire (Blue), Topaz (Yellow).  The school organises training for various National and International entrance examinations such as SAT, ISEET, NEET, and CPT. The School has a Cricket Ground, a Football Ground, a Skating Rink, Two Swimming Pools, Two Basketball Courts, a Volleyball Court along with a Five-Courted Indoor Badminton Stadium. Students take part in competitions in music and dance, hosted by member DPSes. The School also has an contemporary Art Gallery "Varnalepana". The students also participate in sporting events at district, state, and national arenas.

DPS Nalconagar, Angul
DPS Nalconagar established in 1984 and was sponsored by National Aluminium Company Limited (NALCO), and is the third satellite school to be set up under the aegis of Delhi Public School Society. Situated around 130 km away from Bhubaneswar, Odisha, the school occupies 30 acres of land with a multi purpose hall, auditorium, library, laboratories and playing fields. The school has witnessed many developmental works, including the construction of a new block.

DPS Nazira
Established in collaboration with ONGC in its township Nazira.

DPS NIGAHI 

Established in 1998 in collaboration with Northern Coalfield Limited (NCL) in Nigahi District-Singrauli , Madhya Pradesh.

DPS Numaligarh
Located at Numaligarh, in Golaghat district, Assam, it was established in September 1997 and is a Central Board Secondary Education linked school. There are synthetic tennis courts, basketball courts, football grounds, and horse stables. According to 2017 DPS Society rankings the school was ranked fifth among all Delhi Public Schools in the country. It ranked first among all PSU DPS and first among all DPS in North East India.

DPS Ludhiana
The school was the third initiative of the Takshila Educational Society. It was established in 2004 and is a collaborative effort with the Delhi Public Schools Society, which is one of the largest chains of CBSE schools in India. DPS Ludhiana is affiliated to CBSE, New Delhi and offers schooling from Nursery to Class XII.

DPS Khanna
DPS Khanna is located in Ikolahi village near Khanna. Being affiliated to CBSE, it offers schooling from nursery to XII. DPS Khanna provides 3 streams in XI and XII - Science, Humanities and Commerce. It has four houses- Falcons, Panthers, Stallions and Tuskers.

It provides various sports ranging from Swimming, lawn tennis to Horse Riding and Golf to Football, Basketball and Volleyball. It also has indoor games like Billiards. Delhi Public School Khanna is a well known name in Punjab MUN Circuit and in sports.

DPS Mathura Refinery Nagar, Mathura
Mathura Refinery had decided to invite Delhi Public School under which was running under the prestigious Delhi Public School Society, New Delhi to open its branch in Mathura Refinery Nagar to provide good qualities of education as demanded by the employees of Indian Oil Corporation for the welfare of their wards. The School was established on 12 August 1986 with the collaboration of Delhi Public Society & Mathura Refinery. Earlier to this the above school had been run by the ladies club of Mathura Refinery and since the past 20 years the school has grown from strength to strength and providing its good quality of education surrounding the village nearby Mathura Refinery which were having the drawback in the field of education . By its own quality as mentioned as guidelines provided by DPS Society .Today Delhi Public School, MR Nagar stands firmly as an epitome of the motto “Service before self” .

DPS Pinjore

Delhi Public School, Pinjore, is a day-cum-boarding school branch of the DPS Society. It has children from a few countries studying in its  campus.

DPS Panipat City
It is situated 15 km from Panipat City, in Samalkha Up town.

DPS Panipat Refinery
DPS Panipat Refinery was established as an English-medium co-educational school in  1998. It was set up as a joint venture of the DPS Society and IOC, Panipat Refinery primarily to provide education to the employees of Panipat Refinery.

DPS Paradip Refinery

DPS Paradip Refinery, under the aegis of DPS Society, New Delhi, delivers quality education in the township of Paradip, Odisha .The school was inaugurated on 1 April 2014. It has made impressive strides since its inception and which have further accelerated post its successful affiliation to CBSE in 2015. It is situated strategically inside Indian Oil Corporation's Paradip Refinery Township.

DPS Patna

The first initiative of Takshila Educational Society. It was established in 1998 and is a collaborative effort with the Delhi Public Schools Society, which is one of the largest chains of CBSE schools in India. DPS Patna is affiliated to CBSE, New Delhi and offers schooling from Nursery to Class XII.

DPS Pune

Delhi Public School Pune, commonly known as DPS Pune, is a senior secondary school in Pune, Maharashtra, India. It offers schooling from Nursery to Class 12. Established in 2003, the school is a collaboration between Delhi Public School Society and the Takshila Education Society.

Delhi Public School, Pune has affiliation with the Central Board of Secondary Education, based in New Delhi.

The motto of the school is "Service Before Self". It is located in Nyati County.

DPS Palasa
Delhi Public School, Palasa located in Srikakulam district of Andhra Pradesh was established in 2018 and is affiliated to Delhi Public Schools Society. DPS Palasa is affiliated to CBSE and offers schooling from LKG to Vth.

DPS Raipur 
DPS Raipur, situated on the outskirts of Raipur city under the aegis of DPS Society Delhi. It was awarded best Co-Ed Day School In Chhattisgarh 2021-22

DPS Ranchi

Delhi Public School, Ranchi] was established on 17 July 1989. The school is a co-educational English-medium Senior Secondary School recognized by the Directorate of Education and affiliated to Central Board of Secondary Education under All India 10+2 pattern in both science and commerce streams.

DPS Rampurhat
This school was opened in 2022.

DPS Rourkela

Delhi Public School Rourkela was established in 1993. DPS Rourkela is in Sundergarh Odisha. It is situated in Rourkela.

DPS Ruby Park, Kolkata
DPS Ruby Park was established in 2003 and is a co-educational school. It is the first DPS in Kolkata. The school is located at Shanti Pally in Kolkata, and occupies two campuses. DPS Junior Wing and DPS Senior Wing is from class II to XII, which is in Kasba Rathtala( near Acropolis Mall) . There are six houses: Jhelum, Kaveri, Teesta, Ganga, Chenab and Narmada.

DPS Sangrur, Punjab
Delhi Public School Sangrur was established in 2013. The school is a co-educational English-medium Senior Secondary School recognized by the Directorate of Education Punjab and affiliated to Central Board of Secondary Education under All India 10+2 pattern in both science and commerce streams. It is one of the first Smart Schools in the area with all classes as smart classes. It has a library with 5,000 books and a semi-Olympic swimming pool. The pupil population is over 1,000.

Delhi Public School, Secunderabad, Diamond point
DPS Bowenpally, Secunderabad (Hyderabad) is affiliated to CBSE and was established in 2003. It offers education from nursery to class 10.

DPS Servodaya Nagar

Delhi Public School Servodaya Nagar was established in  1997. It was the first Delhi Public School in Kanpur. It is a Primary School having classes from Play Group to Class V. .  DPS Azaad Nagar (under the aegis of Delhi Public School Society, New Delhi and affiliated to CBSE, New Delhi) was established in 2004 as the senior and full-fledged wing of DPS Servodaya Nagar.

DPS Siliguri
It is affiliated to CBSE. It is located in Darjeeling Road, Dagapur in Siliguri. It has hostel facilities. It is the first DPS school in North Established in 2004

Delhi Public School, Sonepat
Established in 2005, DPS Sonepat is a CBSE board school situated in Khewra, Sonepat (NCR Delhi). It offers education from nursery to 12th class in air-conditioned classrooms. Ranjoo Mann, a national award-winning educationalist is the Pro-Vice Chairperson of DPS Sonepat. DPS Sonepat is a residential school that occupies 17 acres.

DPS South Kolkata
Established in 2013, the school is located in Gazipur, Bakrahat in the outskirts of Kolkata. It is affiliated to CBSE. It offers education from Nursery 1 to class 12.

DPS Srinagar

Delhi Public School, Srinagar is a co-educational senior secondary school in Athwajan in the Srinagar district of Jammu and Kashmir, India. Established on 10 March 2003, the school is affiliated with the Delhi Public School Society and the Central Board of Secondary Education (CBSE). The school is run by the D.P. Dhar Memorial Trust and was started on 10 March 2003. DPS Srinagar has classes from L.K.G. to 12th. Each classes has nine sections from A to I.

The school was founded in the year 2003 and the classes started in March 2003, when the CBSE session starts. Initially the school was only from Class 1st to Class 6.

DPS Surat
DPS Surat School is a school in Surat, Gujarat. Its curriculum is centred on the syllabus prescribed by the NCERT/CBSE. The school is divided into four blocks, all of which have their separate facilities: Protos (Pre-Primary - Pre-Nursery to 2), Deuteros (Primary - 3 to 6), Tritos (Secondary - 7 to 10) and Eschatos (Senior Secondary  - 11 and 12). As of curricular year 2022-23, there are 10 classes in each of 3, 4, and 5; 9 classes in 6; and 8 classes in each of 7, 8, 9, and 10: giving a total of nearly 2120 students in just the Deuteros and Tritos blocks. The students are divided into four houses, each represented after a mythical creature.

 Dragon: Veritas vos libera bit. (Lat.: The truth will set you free.)

 Phoenix: Per ardua ad astra. (Lat.: Through struggle to the stars.)

 Gryphon: Fortes fortuna adiuvat. (Lat.: Fortune, goddess of luck, favors the brave.)

 Unicorn: Honor virtutis praemium. (Lat.: Honour is the reward of virtue.)

Interhouse competitions are often held, for example, a Garba (Gujarati Folk Dance) Competition and a Rangoli Competition.

DPS Sushant Lok
Delhi Public School, Sushant Lok has 3,500 students. Affiliated to the CBSE, the school is situated in Sushant Lok. Notable People: Soham Panda:owner-Soham Panda

DPS Udaipur
Delhi Public School, Udaipur, is located a short distance from Udaipur City centre in the Aravali hills. The school offers day boarding and full boarding facilities in a  campus. It was established on 25 April 2007.

DPS Vadodara
The school was started in April 2003 at Kalali in Vadodara. Shekhar Chatterjee of batch 2016 is a notable alumni for his exceptional achievement in Ecommerce Industry and being appointed as CEO of two firms at the age of 12 years and 15 years respectively. The campus is 3,00,000 sq. ft. The school produced the All-India CBSE Humanities topper Astha Sethi in 2012.
The school opened another branch in the green suburb of Harni in Vadodara. The school is headed by Principal Deepali Sekhon. the second campus is believed to be larger and equipped with a mor experienced faculty as the original DPS of vadodara. Located i a rapidly developing area, the school is affiliated with CBSE and can be easily accessed from the area of Sama, Kaurelibagh, Nizampura, and Sayajiganj.

DPS Vasant Kunj

Delhi Public School Vasant Kunj was established in 1991 by the DPS Society. It is one of the 11 "Core Schools" under the direct management of the DPS Society.  The founding principal is Vinay Kumar. DPS VK has a staff of 205 teachers at the senior and junior level and enrolled with 4,000 pupils.

DPS Vidyut Nagar 
Delhi Public School NTPC Vidyut Nagar was established in 1988 by the DPS Society. DPS VN has a staff of 100 teachers at the senior and junior level and enrolled with 1,500 pupils.

DPS Vijaipur 
DPS Vijaipur is a co-educational school. It was founded by the Fertilizer Minister Shri. R. Prabhu in 1985. The school is within the premises of National Fertilizers Limited.

DPS Vijayapura (Bijapur), Karnataka

Delhi Public School Vijayapura ( Bijapur) have a Campus area of 32,374 sq. m. with well equipped Modern Infrastructure. The school is in collaboration between Delhi Public School Society and the Daksha Educational Trust Society. The school is situated at Shirdi Sai Nagar, Atalatti road Bijapur-586125,Karnataka state of India. The School City office located at Yogeshwari Plaza, first Floor, F2 Block, New Vithal Mandir Road, Bijapur-586101.Delhi Public School, Vijayapura has affiliation with the Central Board of Secondary Education, based in New Delhi

DPS Visakhapatnam

Delhi Public School Visakhapatnam came into existence in 1992, as a response to Visakhapatnam Steel Plant's request to provide education to the children of its employees. It is located in Ukkunagaram.

DPS Vijayawada
It is located at Nidamanuru,Vijayawada State capital of Andhra Pradesh

DPS Warangal
Delhi Public School Warangal started functioning on June 5, 1115, the oldest school

DPS Yamuna Nagar, Haryana
DPS Yamuna Nagar was established in 2007. It is located near Bhambholi village 8 km from the city Jagadhri and 13 km from Yamuna Nagar.

DPS Vindhyanagar 
The foundations of Delhi Public School, Vindhyanagar were laid in 1986 in collaboration with the public sector enterprise NTPC Ltd. It is a non-residential co-educational institution located in the township of Vindhyanagar, Madhya Pradesh. The school has around 2,200 pupils and 120 teaching and non-teaching staff.

DPS Varanasi
DPS Varanasi, situated in the "holy city" of Varanasi, was established in 2003. It is located on the NH-2 and a 30-minute drive from the holy city of Varanasi.

DPS Kalinga
Delhi Public School Kalinga was established in 2003 by the Delhi Public School Society and the Vidya Jyoti Trust. The school is under the aegis of and is managed by the Delhi Public School Society. DPS Kalinga is a part of the DPS society. It is located on the outskirts of the twin cities Cuttack and Bhubaneswar at Dist-Cuttack, Odisha. It provides schooling from classes Nursery to Class XII. It is a recognised by the British Council. The school has registered in NCC, Scouts and Guides, etc. and has dedicated trainers. It has more than 3,000 pupils.

DPS Nagpur Road Jabalpur (Madhya Pradesh)
The Delhi Public School, Nagpur Road, Jabalpur, is a member of the Delhi Public School Society. Delhi Public School, Nagpur Road, Jabapur, is promoted by the Raghuvanshi Foundation, which is a non-profit organization registered under the Indian Trust Act. Since its inception in 1996, DPS Nagpur Road, Jabalpur is a co-educational, English-medium school affiliated to C.B.S.E, New Delhi.

DPS Jamnagar
Delhi Public School Jamnagar is part of the DPS Society. The co-educational English-medium CBSE Pattern School launched its first academic year from April 2015. The School is located on Jamnagar Reliance Highway in Jamnagar.

DPS Daulatpur
DPS Daulatpur Haridwar is an initiative by the DPS Society. The School follows the CCE pattern of education of the Central Board of Secondary Education (CBSE).

DPS Kashi
DPS Kashi was established in 2005 in Varanasi. Its campus occupies 10 acres. The school is affiliated to CBSE (10+2, New Delhi)

Overseas
As of April 2022, the DPS Society operates 8 schools outside India in over seven countries. This list of authorized schools outside India is as follows:

 DPS STS School, Dhaka (Bangladesh)
 Texmaco DPS International School (Indonesia)
 Fahaheel Al-Watanieh Indian Private School (Kuwait)
 DPS BPKIHS, Dharan (Nepal)
 DPS Modern Indian School, Doha (Qatar)
 Darussalam International DPS, Riyadh (Saudi Arabia)
 Al Falah International School DPS, Jeddah (Saudi Arabia)
 DPS, Ajman (United Arab Emirates)
 DPS, Sharjah (United Arab Emirates)
 DPS, Dubai (United Arab Emirates)

Kuwait

Fahaheel Al-Watanieh Indian Private School or DPS Kuwait is an educational institution in Kuwait established on 11 September 1995. Its the first School Affiliated to Delhi Public School Society in the gulf. The school is affiliated to the Central Board of Secondary Education. The medium of instruction is English. At the class XI and XII level, the school offers a choice of three streams – Science, Commerce and Humanities.

Nepal

Delhi Public School, Dharan or B.P Koirala Institute of Health Science (BPKIHS) is a school in Dharan, Nepal, run under the aegis of Delhi Public School Society. It was established in 1996.

United Arab Emirates

 Delhi Private School, Ajman, is the only DPS in the United Arab Emirates. Opened in 2017 in the Ajman Province.
 Delhi Private School, Sharjah, is the first DPS in the United Arab Emirates. Opened in 2000 in the Sharjah Province.
 Delhi Private School, Dubai, is another DPS in the United Arab Emirates. Opened in 2003 in the Dubai Province.

Qatar

Delhi Public School - Qatar, also known as DPS-MIS (MIS stands for "Modern Indian School") is an Indian school in Doha. It is affiliated to the CBSE board and follows the NCERT syllabus. It also has FIITJEE as an option. The pupils are divided among four houses: Lotus, Lily, Rose and Tulip. The school takes part in the Annual Model United Nations. The school is led by its principal Ms Asna Nafees.

Saudi Arabia

 Delhi Public School, Riyadh is the first school of its kind in Saudi Arabia, and started its operation in April 2004. It was established by Saudi educationist and businessman Nadeem Tarin. DPS prepares students for the Central Board of Secondary Education (CBSE) of India, later giving them the option of simultaneously entering the British and the CBSE schools certificate examinations.
 Delhi Public School, Jeddah is the second school in Saudi Arabia. It was established in 2004 and located in the Jeddah province.

Ghana 
DPS International Ghana was established in 2010. The school is located in Tema Community 25 in the Greater Accra Region of Ghana.

References 

Delhi Public School Society
Central Board of Secondary Education
Delhi